Luka Spetič (born 5 May 1982) is a Slovenian footballer who played as midfielder for Kras Repen. Since 2017 he plays in Serie D for Cjarlins Muzane and in 2022, at the age og 40, he's thinking about retirement.

But on July 2022 he signed for ASD AŠD Sistiana Sesljan, a club from Eccellenza Friuli-Venezia Giulia.

References

External links
PrvaLiga profile 

1982 births
Living people
Slovenian footballers
Association football midfielders
NK Primorje players
Slovenian expatriate footballers
Slovenian expatriate sportspeople in Italy
Expatriate footballers in Italy
Slovenian PrvaLiga players